The 2023–24 AFC Cup will be the 19th edition of the AFC Cup, Asia's secondary club football tournament organized by the Asian Football Confederation (AFC).

This is the first ever AFC Cup season to have a two-year (autumn-to-spring) schedule, instead of an all-year-round (spring-to-autumn) schedule.

The winners of the tournament will automatically qualify for the 2024–25 AFC Champions League, entering the qualifying play-offs, if they have not qualified through their domestic performance.

Association team allocation
The 47 AFC member associations are ranked based on their club's performance over the last four years in AFC competitions (their national team's FIFA World Rankings are no longer considered). The slots are allocated by the following criteria according to the Entry Manual:
The associations are split into five zones (Article 5.1):
West Asia Zone consists of the 12 associations from the West Asian Football Federation (WAFF).
South Asia Zone consists of the 7 associations from the South Asian Football Federation (SAFF).
Central Asia Zone consists of the 6 associations from Central Asian Football Association (CAFA).
ASEAN Zone consists of the 12 associations from the ASEAN Football Federation (AFF).
East Asia Zone consists of the 10 associations from the East Asian Football Federation (EAFF).
The AFC may reallocate one or more associations to another zone if necessary for sporting reasons
Reallocation of Regions
Excluding the top five associations in each region for AFC Champions League slot allocation, all other associations are eligible to enter the AFC Cup.
The teams from associations ranked 6th, 11th and 12th which are eliminated in the AFC Champions League qualifying play-offs enter the AFC Cup group stage (Article 3.2). The following rules are applied:
The associations ranked 6th in both the West Region and the East Region, while allocated one direct slot in the AFC Cup group stage without taking away any direct slot from other associations, are not ranked in each zone for AFC Cup slot allocation (Article 5.3).
If they advance to the AFC Champions League group stage, the AFC Cup group stage slot is filled by the standby team from their association if such team are available (Article 5.12).
The rules above do not apply to the AFC Champions League title holders and AFC Cup title holders which are allocated AFC Champions League play-off slots should they not qualify for the tournament through domestic performance.
In the West Asia Zone and the ASEAN Zone, there are three groups in the group stage, including 9 direct slots, with the 3 remaining slots filled through qualifying play-offs (Article 5.2). The slots in each zone are distributed as follows:
The associations ranked 1st to 3rd are each allocated two direct slots.
The associations ranked 4th to 6th are each allocated one direct slot and one play-off slot.
The associations ranked 7th or below are each allocated one play-off slot.
If any zone has an association ranked 6th for AFC Champions League slot allocation, which is allocated one direct slot in the AFC Cup group stage, there are 10 direct slots, with the 2 remaining slots filled through qualifying play-offs.
In the South Asia Zone, the Central Asia Zone, and the East Asia Zone, there is one group in the group stage, including 3 direct slots, with the 1 remaining slot filled through qualifying play-offs (Article 5.2). The slots in each zone are distributed as follows:
The associations ranked 1st to 3rd are each allocated one direct slot and one play-off slot.
The associations ranked 4th or below are each allocated one play-off slot.
If any zone has an association ranked 6th for AFC Champions League slot allocation, which is allocated one direct slot in the AFC Cup group stage, there are 4 direct slots, and to ensure equal opportunity in each zone, another group is added to this zone in the group stage, with the 4 remaining slots filled through qualifying play-offs (Article 5.4.1).
If any zone has at least 7 play-off slots, to ensure equal opportunity in each zone, another group is added to this zone in the group stage, with the 5 remaining slots filled through qualifying play-offs (Article 5.4.2).
If any association with direct slots do not fulfill any one of the AFC Cup criteria, they have all their direct slots converted into play-off slots. The direct slots given up are redistributed to the highest eligible association by the following criteria (Articles 5.7 and 5.8):
For each association, the maximum number of total slots is two (Articles 3.4 and 3.5).
If any association is allocated one additional direct slot, one play-off slot is annulled and not redistributed.
If any association with only play-off slot(s), including those mentioned above, do not fulfill the minimum AFC Cup criteria, the play-off slot(s) are annulled and not redistributed (Articles 5.10 and 5.11).
For each association, the maximum number of total slots is one-third of the total number of eligible teams (excluding foreign teams) in the top division (Article 5.6). If this rule is applied, any direct slots given up are redistributed by the same criteria as mentioned above, and play-off slots are annulled and not redistributed (Article 9.10).
All participating teams must be granted an AFC Champions League or AFC Cup license, and, apart from cup winners, finish in the top half of their top division (Articles 7.1 and 9.5). If any association does not have enough teams which satisfy this criteria, any direct slots given up are redistributed by the same criteria as mentioned above, and play-off slots are annulled and not redistributed (Article 9.9).
If any team granted a license refuses to participate, their slot, either direct or play-off, is annulled and not redistributed (Article 9.11).

Association ranking
For the 2023–24 AFC Cup, the associations are allocated slots according to their club competitions ranking which was published on 24 November 2021, which takes into account their performance in the AFC Champions League and the AFC Cup in 2018, 2019 and 2021.

Notes

Teams

Teams in italics will play in the AFC Champions League qualifying play-offs, and will play in the AFC Cup group stage if they fail to advance to the AFC Champions League group stage. Should they advance to the AFC Champions League group stage, they will not play in the AFC Cup, and will be replaced by the standby team from their association if such team is available.

Note: Only teams assured of a place (including standby teams) are displayed.

Notes

Schedule
The schedule of the competition is as follows.

See also
2023–24 AFC Champions League

References

External links

2

2023
Scheduled association football competitions